Anghel Nour was a Bessarabian politician. He served as the first mayor of Chişinău between 1817 and 1821.

Biography 
Angel Nour was born in a family of Moldavian small-local nobles. He participated in the Russo-Turkish War (1806–1812), representing the Russian Empire, rising through the ranks to eventually become captain.

In 1817, for the first time, the elections to the Chișinău City Duma were held. At meetings of the Moldavian, Russian, Bulgarian, Greek and Jewish societies, one representative was elected. The first mayor was elected by the Duma - the "Moldavian service captain" Angel Nour.

He was actively engaged in the improvement of Chișinău, which was ceded to Russia in 1812 after the first Russian annexation of Bessarabia.

Notes

External links
 City Monuments
 Incursion dans l’histoire de Chisinau, la capitale moldave 

Mayors of Chișinău
Moldovan military personnel
Year of death missing
Year of birth missing